Pouya Khazaeli is an Iranian architect. He founded Rai Studio in June 2007, with the aim of reviving what he considers to be the lost spirit of architecture; beyond utility and conceptual design towards the extension of organic settings with reverence to the cultural heritage of the region.

He has worked for Shigeru Ban, Anna Heringer, Bahram Shirdel and Hadi Mirmiran. By 2011 he had completed 4 projects and won four awards, including a first prize from Memar magazine for his low budget bamboo hut.

Notable projects
 Villa in Mazandaran, Iran (2007) 
 Bamboo hut, Mazandaran, Iran (2009) 
 Villa in Darvishabad, Iran (2010)

References 

Iranian architects
1975 births
Living people